Chaworth is a surname. Notable people with the surname include:

Joan Chaworth
Bridget Chaworth (died 1621), gentlewoman of the Privy Chamber to Elizabeth I
Maud Chaworth (1282–1322), English noblewoman and heiress
Viscount Chaworth
Baron Chaworth